Ludovicus Maria Matheus Van Iersel (19 October 1893 – 9 June 1987) was a Sergeant in United States Army, Company M, 9th Infantry, 2d Division during World War I. He earned the highest military decoration for valor in combat—the Medal of Honor—for having distinguished himself at Mouzon, France.

Born in Dussen the Netherlands, Van Iersel served on several merchant ships following the outbreak of the war. Van Iersel arrived in New Jersey in early 1917, enlisting in the army shortly afterwards. He learned English in his first few months of military service.

He became a naturalised American citizen in September 1919, six months after receiving the Medal of Honor, and changed his name to Louis Van Iersel. After acquiring citizenship he returned to his birth country and married Hendrika de Ronde (1899–1979) in August 1920. They returned to the United States later that month and settled in California a year later. In 1946 he and his wife settled in Sierra Madre, California.

During World War II, he joined the Marine Corps and served with the 3rd Marine Division in the Bougainville Campaign.

He and his wife Hendrika are buried at Arlington National Cemetery, in Arlington, Virginia.

Medal of Honor citation

 Rank and organization: Sergeant, U.S. Army, Company M, 9th Infantry, 2d Division.
 Place and date: At Mouzon, France, 9 November 1918.
 Entered service at: Glen Rock, New Jersey.
 Birth: the Netherlands.
 General Orders: War Department, General Orders No. 34 (March 7, 1919)

Citation:
While a member of the reconnaissance patrol, sent out at night to ascertain the condition of a damaged bridge, Sgt. Van Iersel volunteered to lead a party across the bridge in the face of heavy machinegun and rifle fire from a range of only 75 yards. Crawling alone along the debris of the ruined bridge he came upon a trap, which gave away and precipitated him into the water. In spite of the swift current he succeeded in swimming across the stream and found a lodging place among the timbers on the opposite bank. Disregarding the enemy fire, he made a careful investigation of the hostile position by which the bridge was defended and then returned to the other bank of the river, reporting this valuable information to the battalion commander.

Military awards
van Iersel's military decorations and awards include:

See also

 List of Medal of Honor recipients
 List of Medal of Honor recipients for World War I

References

External links
  – burial at Arlington National Cemetery
 
 LA Times orbituary

1893 births
1987 deaths
United States Army personnel of World War I
Iersel, Louis van
Foreign-born Medal of Honor recipients
United States Army soldiers
United States Army Medal of Honor recipients
World War I recipients of the Medal of Honor
Burials at Arlington National Cemetery
Iersel, Louis van
People from Glen Rock, New Jersey
People from Sierra Madre, California
Recipients of the Sea Gallantry Medal